Xylophanes lolita is a moth of the family Sphingidae first described by Jean Haxaire and Thierry Vaglia in 2008.

References

lolita
Moths described in 2008
Endemic fauna of Brazil
Moths of South America